Slobodan Rojević (born 30 April 1958) is a Montenegrin former football manager and player.

Playing career
Rojević started out at his hometown club Sutjeska Nikšić, making 76 appearances and scoring three goals in the Yugoslav Second League from 1977 to 1980. He was subsequently transferred to Partizan in the summer of 1981. Over the next five seasons at the Stadion JNA, Rojević amassed 143 appearances and scored one goal in the Yugoslav First League, while winning two championship titles.

In the summer of 1986, Rojević moved abroad to Switzerland and signed with Sion. He spent two seasons at the club, before switching to Yverdon. A year later, Rojević joined fellow Swiss club Fribourg, before retiring from the game.

Managerial career
After hanging up his boots, Rojević remained living and working in Switzerland, mainly serving as manager at several clubs in the Canton of Fribourg, including FC Fribourg on two occasions.

Honours
Partizan
 Yugoslav First League: 1982–83, 1985–86

References

External links
 
 

1958 births
Living people
Footballers from Nikšić
Yugoslav footballers
Montenegrin footballers
Association football defenders
FK Sutjeska Nikšić players
FK Partizan players
FC Sion players
Yverdon-Sport FC players
FC Fribourg players
Yugoslav Second League players
Yugoslav First League players
Swiss Super League players
Yugoslav expatriate footballers
Expatriate footballers in Switzerland
Yugoslav expatriate sportspeople in Switzerland
Serbia and Montenegro football managers
Montenegrin football managers
FC Fribourg managers
Serbia and Montenegro expatriate football managers
Montenegrin expatriate football managers
Expatriate football managers in Switzerland
Serbia and Montenegro expatriate sportspeople in Switzerland
Montenegrin expatriate sportspeople in Switzerland